Serrasalmus manueli, or the Silver piranha or Manuel's piranha,  is one of the largest species of piranha within the genus Serrasalmus.  Its size and weight are still yet to be determined but it is safe to say that it reaches around the same size and weight as the black piranha. It is a solitary species of piranha contrary to the social lifestyle of the much popular red-bellied piranha. As with all other piranhas, it is one of the hardest biting creatures on the planet relative to the body weight. This is a popular fish among aquarium hobbyists, although not as much as their red bellied or black piranha counterparts. This fish is said to be very sensitive to the environment and water conditions. Most of the large specimens which have been caught from the wild and taken for aquarium use have died on the way to their destination. All of the specimens of this fish found in aquarium hobby are the smaller ones. The largest individual of this fish in captivity is only 35 centimetres long, still a long way from its maximum size. Most of the manueli kept in aquarium never grow to larger size than this. But those individuals in their natural habitat have been reported by the locals to be more than 50 centimetres long which is yet to be confirmed by a reliable source. This species is known to inhabit a diverse range of habitat from the areas of dense rainforest to the tropical grasslands of the Venezuelan Llanos.

References 

Serrasalmidae
Piranhas